Street Corner is a 1953 British drama film. It was written by Muriel and Sydney Box and directed by Muriel. It was marketed as Both Sides of the Law in the United States. While not quite a documentary, the film depicts the daily routine of women in the police force from three different angles. It was conceived as a female version of the 1950 film The Blue Lamp.

It was shot at Pinewood Studios and on location around London. The film's sets were designed by the art director Cedric Dawe.

Plot
The three plotlines comprise a female army deserter guilty of bigamy, a toddler neglected and beaten by its stepmother and an 18-year-old married mother who's caught shoplifting and gets involved with a jewel thief. The film climaxes in a police dog attack on a criminal.

Cast
 Peggy Cummins as Bridget Foster
 Terence Morgan as Ray
 Anne Crawford as Susan
 Rosamund John as Sergeant Pauline Ramsey
 Barbara Murray as WPC Lucy
 Sarah Lawson as Joyce
 Ronald Howard as David Evans
 Eleanor Summerfield as Edna Hurran
 Michael Medwin as Chick Farrar
 Charles Victor as Muller
 Anthony Oliver as Stanley Foster
 Harold Lang as Len
 Dora Bryan as Prostitute
 Eunice Gayson as Janet
 Michael Hordern as D.I. Heron
 Maurice Denham as Mr Dawson
 Yvonne Marsh as Elsa
 Isabel George as Helen
 Nelly Arno as woman customer
Dandy Nichols as Mrs. Furness - Neighbour (uncredited)

Critical reception
The Movie Review Warehouse said of Muriel Box's direction, "she doesn’t do anything terribly innovative with the camera but she does know how to tell a story effectively, which is often a rarer skill in the film world."

References

Bibliography
 Harper, Sue and Porter, Vincent. British Cinema of the 1950s: The Decline of Deference. Oxford University Press, 2007.

External links
 

1953 films
British black-and-white films
British crime drama films
Films directed by Muriel Box
1953 crime drama films
Films set in London
Films shot in London
British crime thriller films
Films produced by Sydney Box
Films with screenplays by Sydney Box
Films with screenplays by Muriel Box
Films shot at Pinewood Studios
1950s crime thriller films
Films shot at Station Road Studios, Elstree
1950s English-language films
1950s British films